"Leila" is a song by American rock band ZZ Top, from their 1981 album El Loco.

The song is a ballad with country and western influences and features Mark Erlewine on steel guitar.

Record World called it a "gorgeous ballad [that] highlights Billy Gibbons' Brian Wilson-ish falsetto vocal flights."

Charts

Personnel
Billy Gibbons: guitar, steel guitar, vocals
Dusty Hill: bass
Frank Beard: drums
Mark Erlewine: pedal steel

References

1980s ballads
1981 singles
ZZ Top songs
Songs written by Frank Beard (musician)
Songs written by Dusty Hill
Songs written by Billy Gibbons
1981 songs
Warner Records singles
Rock ballads
Song recordings produced by Bill Ham